Sindri Már Pálsson (born 21 December 1982) is an Icelandic alpine skier. He competed in three events at the 2006 Winter Olympics.

References

1982 births
Living people
Sindri Már Pálsson
Sindri Már Pálsson
Alpine skiers at the 2006 Winter Olympics
Place of birth missing (living people)
21st-century Icelandic people